For Valour is a 1912 silent American short film made by the Edison Manufacturing Company. It stars Laura Sawyer, Richard R. Neill, Ben Wilson, and James Gordon. It is based on the short story of the same name by Talbot Mundy. It was directed by J. Searle Dawley.

The British Imperial fortress colony of Bermuda and its garrison was used as the location the Edison film, in which two army officers vie for the affections of a Bermudian woman during the Second Boer War. Dawley also shot The Relief of Lucknow at the same time, using the same Bermuda locations and garrisons.

References

External links 
 

1912 films
Films set in Bermuda
American silent short films
Films shot in Bermuda
Films about the British Army
British Empire war films